Kanaleneiland is a district within the Southwest section of the Dutch city of Utrecht. It was listed (in 2005) as one of 40 "problem neighborhoods" that required extra attention by the Dutch Ministry of Housing.

Kanaleneiland's residents have low levels of employment, health, and education. Approximately 76% of the population are not ethnically Dutch, most of them being of Turkish and Moroccan origin. This unique political climate is one that shaped the views of one of its ex-residents, national politician Geert Wilders of the PVV, who lived in the area in the late 1990s. During his time in Kanaleneiland, Geert Wilders lived in an apartment complex on the Marco Pololaan, a busy street overlooking the Columbus park. This apartment complex is located above a Lidl supermarket, and has seen an increase in popularity among right-wingers.

References

Districts in Utrecht (city)